Medicago brachycarpa is a plant species of the genus Medicago. It is found throughout the Middle East. It forms a symbiotic relationship with the bacterium Sinorhizobium meliloti, which is capable of nitrogen fixation.

External links
International Legume Database & Information Services

brachycarpa

Flora of Lebanon and Syria